Blas Esteban Armoa Núñez (born 3 February 2000) is a Paraguayan professional footballer who plays as a winger for Argentine Primera División club Tigre, on loan from Sportivo Luqueño.

Club career
A youth academy product of Sportivo Luqueño, Armoa made his professional debut on 4 April 2017 in Luqueño's 3–2 defeat against Club Libertad. He scored his first goal on 15 April 2017 in his club's 2–1 win against General Díaz.

International career
Armoa is a former Paraguayan youth international. He has played for Paraguay youth national teams at 2017 South American U-17 Championship, 2017 FIFA U-17 World Cup and 2019 South American U-20 Championship.

Armoa was also part of under-23 team squad which competed at 2020 CONMEBOL Pre-Olympic Tournament.

References

External links
 

2000 births
Living people
Paraguayan footballers
Paraguayan expatriate footballers
Association football forwards
Paraguay under-20 international footballers
Paraguay youth international footballers
Paraguayan Primera División players
Liga MX players
Argentine Primera División players
Sportivo Luqueño players
FC Juárez footballers
Club Atlético Tigre footballers
Paraguayan expatriate sportspeople in Mexico
Paraguayan expatriate sportspeople in Argentina
Expatriate footballers in Mexico
Expatriate footballers in Argentina